The Old Huntsman is a 1917 collection of poems by Siegfried Sassoon and the name of the first poem in the collection.

External links

 The Old Huntsman And Other Poems (1917) at Internet Archive

1917 poetry books
English poetry collections
Books by Siegfried Sassoon